2008 floods  may refer to:

2008 Benin floods
2008 Bihar flood
2008 Indian floods
Iowa flood of 2008
2008 Irish flash floods
Early Spring 2008 Midwest floods
June 2008 Midwest floods
2008 Namibia floods
2008 Papua New Guinea floods
2008 Santa Catarina floods
2008 South China floods
2008 Tanana Valley flood
2008 Vietnam floods
2008 Yemen cyclone

See also
List of notable floods
Floods in the United States: 2001-present